The following is a list of political parties that promote the interests of pensioners.

Argentina 
Pensioners' White Party

Australia
 Seniors United Party of Australia (2015-2022)
 Pensioner and Citizen Initiated Referendum Alliance (1982-1999)
 Grey Power (Australia) (1983-1997)
 Pensioner Power Association of Australia, (1968-1972)

Belgium
Becoming older worthily (Waardig Ouder Worden) (active in 1993-2000), got 1 provincial councillor and several municipal and district councillors in Flanders in 1994. Most of its councillors defected to the far right Flemish Blok just before the next elections in 2000, two had defected earlier to the Flemish Liberal Party.
Pensioners' Party (Parti des pensionnés), or Pensioners' and Retired People's Party (Parti des pensionnés et des retraités), had one list at the 2009 regional elections and one at the 2010 federal ones, and several lists at the 2012 provincial and municipal elections, only in Liège Province (Wallonia).  Political scientists rank this party among the far right, its spokesman is an activist in the local Pegida branch.

Bosnia
Party of United Pensioners
 Pensioners' Party of Bosnia and Herzegovina
 Pensioners' Party of the Republika Srpska

Brazil
 Party of the Nation's Retirees (Brazil)

Chile 
Pensioners' Party

Croatia
 Croatian Party of Pensioners (Croatia)

Czech Republic
Pensioners for Life Security

Denmark
 Active Pensionists (Denmark)

Germany
 The Grays – Gray Panthers (Germany, no longer active)
 Pensioners and Retirees Party (Bündnis 21/RRP)

Hungary
 Pensioners' Party (Hungary, no longer active)

Israel
 Generations who Built the Land (Dor), originally Pensioners of Israel to the Knesset (Gil) 
 Justice for the Elderly (faction)

Italy
 United Pensioners
 Pensioners' Party

Luxembourg
 Alternative Democratic Reform Party (Luxembourg)
 Party of the Third Age (Luxembourg, disbanded)

Netherlands
 50PLUS
 Party for the Future (dissolved)
 General Elderly Alliance (dissolved)
 Union 55+ (dissolved)

New Zealand
New Zealand First- core social constituency are elderly voters. 
Conservative Party of New Zealand- contesting elderly vote through appeal to social conservatism

Norway
 Pensioners Party (Norway)

Portugal
 United Party of Retirees and Pensioners

Serbia
 Party of United Pensioners of Serbia (PUPS)

Ukraine
 Party of Pensioners of Ukraine
 Party of Protection of Pensioners of Ukraine
 Bloc of the Party of Pensioners of Ukraine (Ukraine)

United Kingdom
 Pensioners Party (England) (defunct, 2013)
 Senior Citizens Party (defunct, 2014)
 Scottish Senior Citizens Unity Party

Russia
 Russian Party of Pensioners for Justice

Slovenia
 Democratic Party of Pensioners of Slovenia (Slovenia)

Sweden
 Swedish Senior Citizen Interest Party

References

 
Pensioners